John Raymond Patrick (January 16, 1918 – April 29, 2000) was an American football blocking back who played for three seasons in the National Football League (NFL) for the Pittsburgh Steelers in 1941, 1945, and 1946. He played college football for Penn State before being drafted by the Philadelphia Eagles in the 12th round (101st overall) of the 1941 NFL Draft. His rights were transferred to the Steelers due to the events later referred to as the Pennsylvania Polka. He served in World War II for the United States Army before rejoining the Steelers in 1945.

References

1918 births
2000 deaths
People from Somerset County, Pennsylvania
Players of American football from Pennsylvania
American football quarterbacks
Penn State Nittany Lions football players
Pittsburgh Steelers players
United States Army personnel of World War II